Yoyo Mung Ka-wai is a Hong Kong actress. She was signed to TVB until March 2013, having starred in various TVB television shows, including Forensic Heroes I and II.

Career
After graduating from Form 5, Mung worked as a bank clerk.

Upon graduating from high school, Mung started work in an advertising agency.

Mung starred in many television drama serials and movies, including a Cat 3 film "Not the Female School". Her performance in "Expect the Unexpected" earned her a nomination for Best Newcomer in the 18th Hong Kong TVB Awards.

Mung declined to renew her artist contract with TVB in March 2013.

Mung was among the thousands who protested the Hong Kong government's decision to deny HKTV's free-to-air broadcast license in October 2013.

Personal life 
She married actor and singer Ekin Cheng on 28 January 2013.

Filmography

Television

References

External links
 
 
 

20th-century Hong Kong actresses
21st-century Hong Kong actresses
Hong Kong film actresses
Hong Kong television actresses
Living people
People from Panyu District
TVB veteran actors
Year of birth missing (living people)